Brloh is a municipality and village in Pardubice District in the Pardubice Region of the Czech Republic. It has about 200 inhabitants.

Administrative parts
The village of Benešovice is an administrative part of Brloh.

References

External links

Brloh